The Old Uptown Historic District is a historic district in the Midtown neighborhood of Harrisburg, Pennsylvania. The district stretches from Reily to Maclay between Second and Third street. It consists of large Queen Anne and Italianate architecture built in the late 19th century and very early 20th century. The northern part of the historic district is currently being aggressively renovated by real estate investors.

Places of Note
 Simon Cameron School
 William Donaldson House

See also
 List of Harrisburg neighborhoods

References

External links
 HarrisburgPA.gov—City Wide Sights: Historic Midtown and Old Uptown

Houses on the National Register of Historic Places in Pennsylvania
Queen Anne architecture in Pennsylvania
Italianate architecture in Pennsylvania
Geography of Harrisburg, Pennsylvania
Historic districts in Harrisburg, Pennsylvania
Houses in Dauphin County, Pennsylvania
Historic districts on the National Register of Historic Places in Pennsylvania
National Register of Historic Places in Harrisburg, Pennsylvania